Mr Selfridge is a British period drama television series about Harry Gordon Selfridge and his department store, Selfridge & Co, in London, set from 1908 to 1928. It was co-produced by ITV Studios and Masterpiece/WGBH for broadcast on ITV. The series began broadcasting on ITV on 6 January 2013 and 30 March 2016 on PBS in the United States.

Production

Development and production
It was announced on 24 May 2011 that ITV was in discussions with ITV Studios about developing an adaptation of Lindy Woodhead's biography Shopping, Seduction & Mr Selfridge. Andrew Davies was confirmed to be working on the script. Beginning in London in 1908, during a time period when women were enjoying an ever-increasing amount of freedom, it tells the story of Harry Gordon Selfridge, the founder of Selfridges department store and includes members of his family, particularly his wife Rose Selfridge.

It was originally planned to be screened in 2012, and it is claimed that ITV was forced to push back airing the drama due to rival BBC airing a similarly themed drama series The Paradise.

A set to the north of London was built to house a replica of the 1909 Selfridge's store interior. The exterior of the store was recreated in The Historic Dockyard Chatham, in Kent. 

The disused Aldwych tube station was used to film Rose Selfridge travelling on the London Underground and scenes in the first episode.

On 8 February 2013, ITV announced Mr Selfridge had been commissioned for a second series of ten episodes, to start on 19 January 2014. Anthony Byrne, who directed three episodes of series one, returned to direct some of the new episodes. On 22 July 2013, PBS also purchased a second series that aired in 2014 as part of its Masterpiece Classic. The second series is set in 1914 and portrays the consequence of World War I to the store and staff. On 21 February 2014, it was announced that Mr. Selfridge had been renewed for a third series, to air in 2015. On 13 March 2015, ITV announced Mr Selfridge had been commissioned for a new 10-part fourth and final series.

Casting
An American casting director was employed to find an actor suitable to play Harry Selfridge. Jeremy Piven's agent informed him of the role. Producer Chrissy Skinns and director Jon Jones met Piven in Los Angeles and were impressed by his understanding of the character. Executive producer Kate Lewis was "thrilled to attract" Frances O'Connor to the role of Rose Selfridge because she had long been a fan of the actress. Former Coronation Street actress Katherine Kelly signed up to play Lady Mae Loxley and returned for Series 2 and Series 4. The casting of the trio was announced in March 2012 alongside Grégory Fitoussi (Henri Leclair), Aisling Loftus (Agnes Towler), Zoe Tapper (Ellen Love) and Trystan Gravelle (Victor Colleano).

Cast and characters

Series overview

Shop staff

Accessories
Josie Mardle (Series 1–4), Head of Department
Grace Calthorpe (Series 2–3), Shop assistant / Head of Department
Agnes Towler (Series 1), Senior shop assistant
Doris Millar (Series 1), Shop assistant
Kitty Hawkins (Series 1), Shop assistant

Beauty
Kitty Hawkins (Series 2–4), Head of Department
Jessie Pertree (Series 2–3), Shop assistant

Fashion
Flora Bunting (Series 1), Head of Department
Irene Ravilious (Series 1), Head of Department
Mr Thackery (Series 2–3), Head of Department
Josie Mardle (Series 3), Head of Department
Connie Hawkins (Series 3–4), Shop assistant / Head of Department
Agnes Towler (Series 1), Shop assistant
Gordon Selfridge (Series 3), Shop assistant
Meryl Grove (Series 4), Shop assistant

Loading Bay
George Towler (Series 1–2), Assistant / Head of Department
Gordon Selfridge (Series 2), Assistant
Sam (Series 1), Assistant
Alf (Series 1), Assistant
Ed (Series 2), Assistant
Dave (Series 2), Assistant
Sarah Ellis (Series 2–3), Assistant

Offices 
Harry Selfridge (Series 1–4), General Manager
Henri Leclair (Series 2–3), Deputy Manager
Gordon Selfridge (Series 3–4), Deputy Manager / Provincial Stores Manager
Roger Grove, (Series 1–4), Chief of Staff / Deputy Manager
Josie Mardle (Series 4), Deputy Manager
Arthur Crabb (Series 1–4), Finance
Miss Blenkinsopp (Series 1–2), Secretary
Miss Plunket (Series 2–4), Secretary

Design 
Henri Leclair (Series 1), Head of Display
Agnes Towler (Series 2–3), Head of Display
Pierre Longchamp (Series 3), Head of Display
Freddy Lyons (Series 4), Head of Display

The Palm Court 
Mr Perez (Series 1), Head of Department
Victor Colleano, (Series 1–2), Waiter / Head of Department
Franco Colleano (Series 2), Waiter

Sewing Room
Mae Rennard (Series 4), Designer
Sarah Ellis (Series 4), Head of Department
Matilda Brockless (Series 4), Machinist / Head of Department
Prue (Series 4), Machinist
Joyce (Series 4), Machinist

Other departments 
Gordon Selfridge (Series 2), Tea
George Towler (Series 3–4), Head of Security
Miss Blenkinsop (Series 3–4), Head of Information Bureau

Episodes

Series 1 (2013)
(1908–10)

Series 2 (2014)
(1914)

Series 3 (2015)
(1918–19)

Series 4 (2016)
(1928–29)

Reception
In a poll hosted by MSN more than 80% of readers said they would continue watching the show following the first episode. Phil Hogan writing for The Guardian bemoaned the story development. He observed that there is "so much crisis with so little drama". Ross Sweeney from Cultbox said that the show had direction but lacked "actual substance and any real surprises". He praised the costume designers for their "astonishing attention to detail". Susanna Lazarus of the Radio Times opined that the character's earnestness detracted from the realism of the story. She added the female cast created the "plot tension" needed to maintain viewership. Gabriel Tate of Time Out branded it an unsubtle, daft series with glorious production values but felt it was "ideal escapism for a Sunday night". He also stated that the character of Agnes Towler was "the heart of the show". Benjamin Secher from The Daily Telegraph said that Mr Selfridge is a "less cosy, more charismatic" production of The Paradise. A "sumptuous, frothy drama" and "entertaining spectacle", but ultimately Secher did not believe the story. MSN critic Dan Owen branded it "sumptuous Sunday evening viewing". He thought the "wonderful" sets and costumes were better than those featured in fellow period drama Downton Abbey.

Broadcasts
The programme has been distributed internationally by ITV Studios' Global Entertainment brand. ITV sold the series to a number of countries at the 2012 Mipcom event. In addition they have pre-sold the show to Australia's Seven Network and the satellite television provider, Yes, in Israel. In the Netherlands, Series 1 was aired starting August, 2013 and series 2 was aired from July 2014. In Sweden "Mr Selfridge" was aired at the public service network SVT. The last two episodes of season 4 were aired as a double on 25 June 2016 on SVT1.

Notes

References

External links
 
 
 Mr Selfridge at What's on TV
 Shopping, Seduction & Mr Selfridge, the book by Lindy Woodhead

Fiction set in 1908
Fiction set in 1909
Fiction set in 1910
Fiction set in 1914
Fiction set in 1918
Fiction set in 1919
Fiction set in 1928
2010s British drama television series
2013 British television series debuts
2016 British television series endings
Department stores in fiction
English-language television shows
ITV television dramas
Selfridges
Television shows based on books
Television series based on actual events
Television series by ITV Studios
Television series set in the 1900s
Television series set in the 1910s
Television series set in the 1920s
Television series set in shops
Television shows set in London